William Morgan (December 8, 1848 – ?) was an Ontario businessman and political figure. He represented Norfolk South in the Legislative Assembly of Ontario from 1879 to 1890 as a Conservative member.

He was born in Stirling, Hastings County, Canada West in 1848, the son of John Dwyer Morgan who came to Upper Canada from Wales. He entered business as a merchant in Walsingham Centre, moving for a while to Port Rowan before returning. In 1882, he began manufacturing paints. Morgan served as reeve for Walsingham Township. He also commanded a militia battalion and was a member of the local Freemason lodge. Morgan was an agent for a telegraph company and served as postmaster.

External links 
The Canadian parliamentary companion, 1883 JA Gemmill

A Cyclopæedia of Canadian biography : being chiefly men of the time ..., GM Rose (1886)

1848 births
Progressive Conservative Party of Ontario MPPs
Canadian Methodists
Year of death missing